Pseudidonauton siamica is a species of moth of the family Limacodidae. It is found in northern Thailand and central Vietnam at altitudes between 119 and 2,300 meters.

The wingspan is 14–15 mm. Adults have a pale brown ground colour. The forewings have a basal dark area, defined by a whitish distal border. Adults have been recorded in early and mid-October.

Etymology
The species name siamica  refers to the type locality, Siam is the former name for Thailand.

References

External links 
 The Barcode of Life Data Systems (BOLD)

Limacodidae
Moths described in 2009
Moths of Asia